The Cat is a 1947 Argentine drama film directed by Mario Soffici, based on a play by Rino Alessi. It was entered into the 1947 Cannes Film Festival.

Plot
Two upper-class women and a young man became trapped in a love triangle which eventually evolved into a tragedy.

Cast
 Zully Moreno
 Sabina Olmos
 Nélida Bilbao
 Enrique Diosdado (as Enrique Álvarez Diosdado)
 Alberto Closas
 Horacio Priani
 Carlos Alajarín
 Tito Grassi
 Violeta Martino
 Adolfo Linvel

References

External links

1947 films
1947 drama films
Argentine drama films
1940s Spanish-language films
Argentine black-and-white films
Films directed by Mario Soffici
1940s Argentine films